You Deserve Love is the third studio album by American rock band, White Reaper. The album was released through Elektra Records on October 18, 2019.

Background 
Following the conclusion of their tour with The Struts in the autumn of 2018, White Reaper began recording new material for a third studio album. On May 29, 2019 the lead-off single for You Deserve Love, called "Might Be Right" was released. The second single, "Real Long Time" came out two months later. On August 27, 2019 the album was announced with the third single, "1F". In describing the album name, bassist Sam Wilkerson said  “Everyone stopped me at You Deserve Love,” he says. “I think it’s cool, because it’s true for everybody. I think it’s what everybody needs to hear.”

Critical reception

You Deserve Love was met with "generally favorable" reviews from critics. At Metacritic, which assigns a weighted average rating out of 100 to reviews from mainstream publications, this release received an average score of 77, based on 7 reviews. Loudwire named it one of the 50 best rock albums of 2019.

Track listing 
Adapted from Apple Music.

Personnel
Credits adapted from Tidal.

Musicians
 Tony Esposito – guitar , vocals 
 Nick Wilkerson – drums , percussion 
 Sam Wilkerson – bass 
 Hunter Thompson – guitar 
 Ryan Hater – keyboard 

Personnel
 Jay Joyce – producer, mixer 
 Joe LaPorta – mastering 
 Chris Taylor – assistant engineer 
 Jimmy Mansfield – assistant engineer 
 Jason Hall – engineer

References 

2019 albums
White Reaper albums
Atlantic Records albums
Elektra Records albums
Albums produced by Jay Joyce